Ground resonance is an imbalance in the rotation of a helicopter rotor when the blades become bunched up on one side of their rotational plane and cause an oscillation in phase with the frequency of the rocking of the helicopter on its landing gear. The effect is similar to the behavior of a washing machine when the clothes are concentrated in one place during the spin cycle. It occurs when the landing gear is prevented from freely moving about on the horizontal plane, typically when the aircraft is on the ground.

Causes and consequences

Articulated rotor systems with drag hinges allow each individual blade to advance or lag in its rotation to compensate for stress on the blade caused by the acceleration and deceleration of the rotor hub (due to momentum conservation). When the spacing of the blades becomes irregular, it shifts the rotor's center of gravity from the axis of rotation, which causes an oscillation. When the airframe begins to rock back and forth from the oscillation, the oscillations can reinforce each other and cause the rotor's center of gravity to spiral away from the axis of rotation to a point beyond the compensating ability of the damping system.

Ground resonance is usually precipitated by a hard landing or an asymmetrical ground contact, and is more likely to occur when components of the landing gear or damping system are improperly maintained, such as the drag hinge dampers, oleo struts, or wheel tire pressure. Under extreme conditions, the initial shock can cause violent oscillations that quickly build and result in catastrophic damage of the entire airframe. In some cases, complete destruction occurs, e.g. body panels, fuel tanks, and engines are torn away, even at normal rotor speed.

Mitigation
Proper maintenance of the helicopter's damping system components can prevent ground resonance from taking hold. When it does occur, recovery is often possible if action is taken quickly. If sufficient rotor RPM exists, immediate takeoff can restore rotor balance by allowing the airframe to freely move and help damp the oscillation. If rotor RPM is very low during a ground resonance incident, complete shutdown may be sufficient.

See also
Helicopter flight controls
Helicopter pilotage
Helicopter rotor
Aeronautical engineering

References 

Basic Helicopter Handbook, US Department of Transportation, Federal Aviation Administration

External links
 Video of a Brazilian rescue AS350BA breaking apart after landing due to ground resonance.
 Chinook helicopter with wheeled landing gear ground resonance - side view video
 Chinook helicopter with wheeled landing gear ground resonance - rear view video

Helicopter aerodynamics
Waves
Aviation risks